Deadlock is a German heavy metal band from Schwarzenfeld, Bavaria. In 2010 they supported Lacuna Coil on tour. The band consists of only founding member Sebastian Reichl (guitar) alongside John Gahlert (vocals), Margie Gerlitz (vocals), Ferdinand Rewicki (guitar), Christian Simmerl (bass) and Werner Riedl (drums).

History

Early days (1997-2001)
Formed in 1997 as a hardcore band by vocalist Johannes Prem, guitarist Sebastian Reichl, and drummer Tobias Graf, they released the 7" vinyl Deadlock in 1999. After this came the EP I'll Wake You, When Spring Awakes in 2000.

The Arrival and Earth. Revolt (2002-2006)
2002 saw the release of their first album, The Arrival. The album featured keyboards, orchestral elements and guest clean vocals from Sabine Scherer.

Their second album, Earth. Revolt was released in 2005. The band had expanded from a quartet to a six-piece with new guitarist Gert Rymen and clean vocalist Sabine Scherer now a full-time member of the band. The album featured a cleaner, more technical style and again employed clean vocals by Sabine Scherer.

Wolves and Manifesto (2007-2009)
Their third album, Wolves, was released in 2007, and featured prominently electronic and trance influences. The track "Code of Honor" was turned into their first music video.  They launched a tour in support of "Wolves" through Europe alongside Neaera and Maintain.

Their fourth album, Manifesto, was released in November 2008. (January 2009 in North America) The song "Deathrace" features rapping, while the song "Dying Breed" features clean vocals from former Scar Symmetry vocalist Christian Älvestam, and the song "Fire At Will" has a saxophone solo. It also includes a cover of The Sisters of Mercy's "Temple of Love".  The track "The Brave/Agony Applause" is the first single of the album and has a music video.  They promoted "Manifesto" by playing one new song of the album each day on their MySpace until its European release.

Deadlock announced on a MySpace bulletin on December 12, 2008 that they had parted ways with Thomas Huschka (bassist), citing "musical and personal differences". On May 7, 2009, they announced John Gahlert as their new bassist.

Bizarro World (2010-2011)
Deadlock released their 5th album Bizarro World in February 2011.

On 2010, Sabine Scherer was guest vocalist and Sebastian Reichl was guest guitarist in the album Invictus by the German band Heaven Shall Burn in the song "Given in Death".

Line up changes and The Arsonist (2011-)
On October 26, 2011, it was announced that founding vocalist/lyricist Joe Prem had left the band, having performed for 14 years. On the 21st November 2011, Deadlock announced via their Facebook page that bassist John Gahlert would become the new harsh vocalist, having previously performed on occasion when Joe Prem was unable to play, and that bass duties would be handled by Ferdinand Rewicki, who had in the past toured with the band under the various guises of driver, tour manager, and "merch guy".

On 8 February 2013, it was announced that guitarist Gert Rymen had decided to part ways with the band, reducing the lineup to a 5 piece. On March 21 of the same year, the band signed to Napalm Records through whom they announced they would release their next album. It will be the first release featuring former bassist John Gahlert on "harsh" vocal duties, and former tour manager Ferdinand Rewicki on bass and rhythm guitar.

The band released its sixth full-length album The Arsonist on July 26, 2013.

The Re-Arrival, and Hybris
April 28, 2014, it was announced via the band's Facebook page that Tobias Graf had departed the band, leaving Sebastian Reichl as the only remaining original member. On September 4 it was revealed that Graf had died at the age of 35.

Deadlock released The Re-Arrival in August 2014, an album of re-makes of songs from earlier albums. In September it was announced that Scherer was beginning her maternity leave, and the band was temporarily replacing her with Margie Gerlitz. On April 28, 2016, it was announced that she was departing the band permanently to spend more time with her family, while also announcing that Gerlitz would become the new clean vocalist.

In May 2016, the band announced their new album Hybris along with the lead single Berserk. The album was then released on July 8, 2016.

Musical style
Deadlock incorporate melodic death metal as well as some metalcore aspects. What makes Deadlock different is the combination of death growls and female clean vocals. Also included in their sound are techno sections, often used as intros but sometimes used as a whole breakdown section, where a complete genre change takes place. The band used C tuning on 6-string guitars, until the release of The Arsonist in 2013 when they began using drop F tuning on 7-string guitars, strongly influenced from the popular djent movement.

Deadlock started as a vegan straight edge band and, while all its members are still vegan (as of 2019), they began to include non-straight edge people since John Gahlert joined. Many of their lyrics (particularly the songs on Manifesto) are about animal rights.

Members

Current members
 Sebastian Reichl – lead guitar, keyboards and backing vocals (1997–present) 
 John Gahlert -  harsh vocals (2011–present), bass (2009–2011)
 Ferdinand Rewicki - rhythm guitar and backing vocals (2013–present), bass (2011-2015)
 Werner Riedl - drums (2014–present)
 Christian Simmerl - bass (2015–present)
 Margie Gerlitz – clean vocals (2016–present)

Former members
 "Mike" - bass (1997–1999)
 Hans-Georg Bartmann - bass (1999–2002)
 Thomas Gschwendner - rhythm guitar (2002–2004)
 Thomas Huschka – bass (2002–2008)
 Johannes Prem – harsh vocals, lyrics (1997–2011)
 Gert Rymen – rhythm guitar (2004–2013)
 Tobias Graf – drums (1997–April 2014, died September 2014)
 Sabine Scherer (née Weniger) – clean vocals (2002–2016)

Timeline

Discography

Studio albums

Demos

EPs

Singles

Splits

Music videos

References

External links

 Official Homepage
 
 
 Deadlock at Encyclopaedia Metallum: The Metal Archives

Musical groups established in 1997
German metalcore musical groups
German melodic death metal musical groups